Memory is a Thai horror film released in 2008. It stars Ananda Everingham and Mai Charoenpura.

Plot
Krit, a married psychiatrist in Chiang Mai, is tasked with looking in on Phrae, an abused, 7-year-old girl. Her mother, Ing-orn, cannot explain the bruises on the girl's body. As he participates in the case, Krit finds himself falling in love with Ing-orn.

References

External links

2008 films
Thai horror films